Neemi is a village in Saaremaa Parish, Saare County in western Estonia.

Before the administrative reform in 2017, the village was in Pöide Parish.

There's a dendrarium in Neemi that was established in 1925 by the village smith Mihkel Rand (1871–1958).

References 

Villages in Saare County